Coleus rotundifolius, synonyms Plectranthus rotundifolius and Solenostemon rotundifolius, commonly known as native or country potato in Africa and called Chinese potato in India, is a perennial herbaceous plant of the mint family (Lamiaceae) native to tropical Africa. It is cultivated for its edible tubers primarily in West Africa, as well as more recently in parts of Asia, especially India, Sri Lanka, Malaysia, and Indonesia.

C. rotundifolius is closely related to the coleus plants widely cultivated as ornamentals and is now again placed in the genus Coleus, after being placed in the defunct genus Solenostemon and in Plectranthus.

Use and cultivation
The egg-shaped tubers of the native potato appear very similar to the unrelated true potato, though they are smaller than modern commercial varieties. They are typically boiled, but may also be roasted, baked, or fried. Their flavor is bland, but sweeter than Coleus esculentus.

Native potato is overwhelmingly a subsistence crop, though flour milling is reported in Burkina Faso.

C. rotundifolius is one of three Coleus species native to Africa grown for their edible tubers and using the same vernacular names.  The others, C. esculentus and C. edulis, native to southern Africa and Ethiopia, respectively, have not spread beyond Africa. Its cultivation has been largely displaced by the spread of cassava, which was introduced by the Portuguese to Africa from South America about 500 years ago.

Names

In Africa, Coleus rotundifolius is also known as the Hausa potato or Sudan potato, in addition to the names native potato and country potato.

See also
Coleus esculentus (Livingstone potato)

References

rotundifolius
Root vegetables
Crops originating from Africa